Andrew Fowler may refer to:
 Andrew Fowler (Baptist minister)
 Andrew Fowler (swimmer)
 Andrew Fowler (journalist)